Curling at the 2003 Winter Asian Games was at the Aomori City Sports Complex in Aomori, Aomori Prefecture, Japan from February 5–7, with both men's and women's events.

This was the first Winter Asiad that included the sport in the official program.

Schedule

Medalists

Medal table

Participating nations
A total of 40 athletes from 4 nations competed in curling at the 2003 Asian Winter Games:

References
Results of the Fifth Winter Asian Games

External links
Results

 
2003 Asian Winter Games events
Asian Games
2003